Parliamentary elections were held in the People's Republic of Albania on 3 June 1962. The Democratic Front was the only party able to contest the elections, and subsequently won all 214 seats. Voter turnout was reported to be 100%, with only seven registered voters not voting.

Results

References

Parliamentary elections in Albania
Albania
1962 in Albania
One-party elections
Albania